Kubba Sportswear is a Singapore sportswear brand founded in 2006. The headquarters are located at Swen Labels International Pte. Ltd. located at One Fullerton, Singapore. The company designs and manufactures shoes, clothing and accessories. It also supplies police and military uniforms and tactical boots and gears as well.

Sponsorships
Kubba is a sponsor of international football brands across the world. The company sponsors both football and volleyball teams.

Former sponsored teams

National teams

Africa

Asia

Current sponsored teams

Football clubs

Africa
 LPRC Oilers
 Asante Kotoko SC (2014) 
Berekum Chelsea F.C. (2010)

Asia 
 Perlis FA (2012)
 Kuala Muda Naza FC (2009) 
 
Europe 
 FK Jagodina (2013)

References

External links
Official Website
Swen Labels International

Sportswear brands
Sport in Singapore
Singapore League Cup
Shoe brands